The Square of Martyrs, also known as Independence Square (Mustakillik Square), is a historical monument located in Tashkent, Uzbekistan.

The square was built to commemorate victims of Tsarist and Soviet colonialism during the 20th century. This includes those marked as "enemies of the people" who were eliminated from the history and culture of the Uzbek people. The park was announced in July 1999.

Design
The museum building is situated at the edge of the rotunda. The building was built according to national architectural traditions. The museum's first exhibition consisted of 6 sections.

In 2007 and 2008, the museum was improved to reflect the stories of "victims of repression". Major changes included a renovation and expansion of the domed exhibition hall. The flags of the 42 national patterns were hung and the exhibition extended to 10 sections.

References

Buildings and structures in Tashkent
Squares in Uzbekistan
Tourist attractions in Tashkent